RBAC Football Club  (Thai: สโมสรฟุตบอลอาร์แบค) is a defunct Thai semi-professional football club. It last played in Regional League Division 2.

History

Beginning
RBAC F.C. were born off the back of Bangkok Metropolitan Administration F.C., who went bankrupt in the Asian Financial Crisis of 1998. Bangkok Metropolitan Administration F.C. themselves took over from SET F.C. (Stock Exchange of Thailand) in similar circumstances in the early years of the Thailand Premier League.

SET F.C. reached the championship final playoff match in 1997, where they came up against Bangkok Bank F.C. in which they lost 2–0. Bangkok Bank F.C. therefore claimed in the inaugural Thailand Premier League title and SET F.C. claimed the runners up spot.

First name change
Following a new set-up for the Thailand Premier League 1997 season, SET F.C., played under the name Bangkok Metropolitan Administration F.C. and came in a creditable 7th position. The following year, Bangkok Metropolitan Administration F.C. fell down the league table and finished in 11th position, which forced the club to enter the promotion / relegation end of season playoff match. Here they met Assumption Sriracha. This year also saw Bangkok Metropolitan Administration F.C. first piece of silverware as they won the 14th Yamaha Thailand Cup, beating Nakhon Si Thammarat in the final.

Second name change & Relegation to Division 1
In the Thailand Premier League 1999 season they moved up the table and finished in 9th position, an improvement on the previous year. The Thailand Premier League 2000 season was BMA's last, as they finished in 4th position but fell on hard times and were replaced by Rattana Bundit the following year in the Thailand Premier League. It is believed that the club uses the same badge but plays under a different name from BMA and has closer links to the university in the area.

In their first appearance in the Premier League under their newly formed club, Rattana succumbed to relegation to the Thailand Division 1 League, after they could only total 18 points and only 10 goals in 22 matches in a very poor season.

In 2010 Thai Division 1 League, Rattana endured a disappointing season and finished 14th which resulted in them being relegated. However, due to an expansion of the league, they were given a reprieve when they defeated Rayong F.C. 4–2 in a two-legged playoff to retain they're Thailand Division 1 League status for 2011.

Relegation to Division 2
After 2011 Thai Division 1 League, RBAC was relegated to the 2012 Regional League Division 2. BEC Tero Sasana F.C. took over the club and run the club as the reserve team. The club has changed the name after parent team RBAC BEC Tero Sasana F.C. well known as 'R-BEC'. The proposal of the team is to produce young players to senior team as FC Barcelona B that produce player to FC Barcelona. The first season of R-BEC, BEC Tero Sasana F.C. bought many national u-19 team players and sent on loan with this club. Andrew Ord,a coach of BEC Tero Sasana F.C. youth team, was sent to coach this team. After poor season of 2011 Thai Premier League, Phayong Khunnaen step down of senior team and BEC Tero Sasana F.C. promoted Andrew Ord to coaching senior team and sent Samrit Sechanah to coaching reserve team.

After 2013 Thai Division 2 League Bangkok & field Region, RBAC cancel BEC Tero Sasana F.C. and had set new team to played 2014 Thai Division 2 League Bangkok & field Region

After 2014 Thai Division 2 League Bangkok & field Region, Ratchaburi F.C. took over the club and run the club as the reserve team. The club has changed the name after parent team Ratchaburi Mitr Phol RBAC F.C. well known as 'RBM-R'. The proposal of the team is to produce young players to senior team as FC Barcelona B that produce player to FC Barcelona.

In 2016, RBAC Football Club decided to dissolved the team.

Honours

Thai Premier League: Runners-up 1996–97 (under name of Stock Exchange of Thailand Football Club)
 Yamaha Thailand Cup: 1998 (under name of Bangkok Metropolitan Administration Football Club)

Season by season record

References

External links 
 https://www.facebook.com/RatchaburiMitrPholRBAC

Association football clubs established in 1998
Association football clubs disestablished in 2016
Defunct football clubs in Thailand
Football clubs in Thailand
Sport in Bangkok
1998 establishments in Thailand
2016 disestablishments in Thailand
University and college association football clubs